Podvin is a small settlement in the Municipality of Žalec in east-central Slovenia. It lies on Ložnica Creek north of Žalec. The area is part of the traditional region of Styria. The municipality is now included in the Savinja Statistical Region.

History
Podvin became a separate settlement in 1991, when its territory was administratively separated from that of Gotovlje and Ložnica pri Žalcu.

References

External links
Podvin at Geopedia

Populated places in the Municipality of Žalec